Charles Eugène de Lalaing d'Audenarde (13 November 1779 – 4 March 1859) was an officer in the French army during the French Revolutionary Wars and the Napoleonic Wars.

He was born in the House of Lalaing, descendant of Philip de Lalaing, Lord of La Mouillerie. His father was Eugène-François de Lalaing d'Audenaerde, Lord Chamberlain of the Empress and his mother was Agathe-Sophie d'Epegrac.

His name is inscribed  on the Eastern pillar (column 12) of the Arc de Triomphe.

Notes

References

Further reading 

Military personnel from Paris
1779 births
1859 deaths
Generals of the First French Empire
Barons of the First French Empire
French Senators of the Second Empire
Members of the Chamber of Peers of the July Monarchy
Grand Croix of the Légion d'honneur
Names inscribed under the Arc de Triomphe
Ch